Mir Osman Ali Khan, Asaf Jah VII  (5 or 6 April 1886 – 24 February 1967), was the last Nizam (ruler) of the Princely State of Hyderabad, the largest princely state in British India. He ascended the throne on 29 August 1911, at the age of 25 and ruled the Kingdom of Hyderabad between 1911 and 1948, until India annexed it. He was styled as His Exalted Highness-(H.E.H) the Nizam of Hyderabad, and was widely considered as one of the world's wealthiest people of all time. With some estimate placing his wealth at 2% of U.S. GDP, his portrait was on the cover of Time magazine in 1937. As a semi-autonomous monarch, he had his own mint, printing his own currency, the Hyderabadi rupee, and had a private treasury that was said to contain £100 million in gold and silver bullion, and a further £400 million of jewels (in 2008 terms). The major source of his wealth was the Golconda mines, the only supplier of diamonds in the world at that time. Among them was the Jacob Diamond, valued at some £50 million (in 2008 terms), and used by the Nizam as a paperweight.

During his 37-year rule, electricity was introduced, and railways, roads and airports were developed. He was known as the "Architect of modern Hyderabad" and is credited with establishing many public institutions in the city of Hyderabad, including among others: Osmania University, Osmania General Hospital, State Bank of Hyderabad, Begumpet Airport, and the Hyderabad High Court. Two reservoirs, Osman Sagar and Himayat Sagar, were built during his reign, to prevent another great flood in the city. Nizam Sagar Dam named after the Nizam of Hyderabad. Constructed by Mir Osman Ali Khan, Asaf Jah VII in 1923, a reservoir constructed across the Manjira River, a tributary of the Godavari River, between Achampet and BanjePally villages of the Kamareddy district in Telangana, India. It is located at about 144 km (89 mi) north-west of Hyderabad. Nizam Sagar is the oldest dam in the state of Telangana.  

The Nizam had refused to accede to India after the country’s independence on 15th August, 1947. He wanted to remain an independent state or join Pakistan. By then; however, his power had weakened because of the Telangana Rebellion and the rise of a radical militia known as the Razakars whom he could not put down. In 1948, the Indian Army invaded and annexed Hyderabad State, and the Nizam had to surrender. Post-independence, he became the Rajpramukh of Hyderabad State between 1950 and 1956, after which the state was partitioned and became part of Andhra Pradesh, Karnataka and Maharashtra.

In 1951, he not only started the construction of Nizam Orthopedic hospital (now known as Nizam's Institute of Medical Sciences (NIMS)) and gave it to the government on a 99-year lease for a monthly rent of just Rs.1, he also donated  of land from his personal estate to Vinobha Bhave's Bhoodan movement for re-distribution among landless farmers.

Early life

Mir Osman Ali Khan was born 5 or 6 April 1886, the second son of Mahbub Ali Khan, Asaf Jah VI and Azmat-uz-Zahra Begum at Purani Haveli (also known as Masarrat Mahal palace). He was educated privately and reportedly became fluent in Urdu, Persian, Arabic and English. Under Nawab Muhammad Ali Beg he received court ethics and military training.

On the recommendation of the Viceroy of India, Lord Elgin in 1898, in early 1899 Sir Brian Egerton (of the Egerton family and former tutor to Maharajah of Bikaner Ganga Singh) was appointed as Mir Osman Ali Khan's English tutor for two years. During this period he lived away from the principal palace. He lived on his own to avoid the atmosphere of the palace quarters under the guidance of Sir Brian and other British officials and mentors, so that he could flourish as a gentleman of the highest class. Sir Brian Egerton recorded that as a child, Mir Osman Ali Khan was magnanimous and "anxious to learn". Because of the indomitable attitude of zenana (the women) who were determined to send Mir Osman Ali Khan out of Hyderabad for further studies, he pursued them at Mayo College after consultation with the principal nobles of the Paigah family.

Reign

Mir Mahboob Ali Khan the VI Nizam died on 29 August 1911 and on the same day Mir Osman Ali Khan was proclaimed Nizam VII under the supervision of Nawab Shahab Jung, a minister of Police and Public works. On 18 September 1911, the crowning ceremony was officially held at the Chowmahalla Palace.

His coronation Durbar (court) included the prime minister of Hyderabad- Maharaja Kishen Pershad, Colonel Alexander Pinhey (1911–1916) British resident of Hyderabad, the Paigah, and the distinguished nobles of the state and the head of principalities under Nizam domain.

The famous mines of Golconda were the major source of wealth for the Nizams, with the Kingdom of Hyderabad being the only supplier of diamonds for the global market in the 18th century.

Mir Osman Ali Khan acceded as the Nizam of Hyderabad upon the death of his father in 1911. The state of Hyderabad was the largest of the princely states in pre-independence India. With an area of 86,000 square miles (223,000 km2), it was roughly the size of the present-day United Kingdom. The Nizam was the highest-ranking prince in India, was one of only five princes entitled to a 21-gun salute, held the unique title of "Nizam", and titled "His Exalted Highness" and "Faithful Ally of the British Crown".

Early years (1911 to 1918)

In 1908, three years before the Nizam's coronation, the city of Hyderabad was struck by a major flood that resulted in the death of thousands. The Nizam, on the advice of Sir M. Visvesvaraya, ordered the construction of two large reservoirs—the Osman Sagar and Himayat Sagar—to prevent another flood.

He was given the title of "Faithful Ally of the British Crown" after World War One because of his financial contribution to the British Empire's war effort. Part of the reason behind his unique title of "His Exalted Highness" and other titles was due to the huge amounts of financial help that he provided the British amounting nearly £25 million (£ in ). (For example, No. 110 Squadron RAF's original complement of Airco DH.9A aircraft were Osman Ali's gift. Each aircraft bore an inscription to that effect, and the unit became known as the "Hyderabad Squadron".) He also paid for a Royal Navy vessel, the N-class destroyer,  commissioned in 1940 and transferred to the Royal Australian Navy.

In 1918, the Nizam issued a firman (decree) that established Osmania University, the first university to have Urdu as the language of instruction. The present campus was completed in 1934. The firman also mentioned the university's detailed mission and objectives. The establishment of Osmania University was highly lauded by Nobel-Prize Laureate-Poet Rabindranath Tagore who was overjoyed to see the day when Indians are "freed from the shackles of a foreign language and our education becomes naturally accessible to all our people".

Post-World War (1918 to 1939)

In 1919, the Nizam ordered the formation of the Executive Council of Hyderabad, presided over by Sir Sayyid Ali Imam, including eight other members, each in charge of one or more departments. The president of the Executive Council would also be the prime minister of Hyderabad.

The Begumpet Airport was established in the year 1930 with the eventual formation of Hyderabad Aero Club by the Nizam in 1936. Initially, the Nizam's private airways the Deccan Airways, one of the earliest airlines in British India, used it as a domestic and international airport. The terminal building was constructed in 1937. The first commercial flight took off from the airport in 1946.

Final years of his reign (1939 to 1948)

The Nizam arranged a matrimonial alliance with deposed caliph Abdulmejid II whereby the Nizam's first son Azam Jah would marry Princess Durrushehvar of the Ottoman Empire. It was believed that the matrimonial alliance between the Nizam and Abdulmejid II would lead to the emergence of a Muslim ruler who could be acceptable to the world powers in place of the Ottoman Sultans. After India's Independence, the Nizam attempted to declare his sovereignty over the state of Hyderabad, either as a protectorate of the British Empire or as a sovereign monarchy. However, his power weakened because of the Telangana Rebellion and the rise of the Razakars, a radical Muslim militia who wanted Hyderabad to remain under Muslim rule. In 1948, India invaded and annexed Hyderabad State, and the rule of the Nizam ended. He became the Rajpramukh and served from 26 January 1950 to 31 October 1956.

Contributions to society

Educational initiatives
By donating to major educational institutions throughout India, he introduced many educational reforms during his reign. Up to 11% of his budget was spent on education. Schools, colleges and a Department for Translation were set up. Primary education was made compulsory and provided free for the poor.

Osmania University

He founded the Osmania University in 1918 through a royal firman; It is one of the largest universities in India. Schools, colleges and a Department for Translation were set up.

Construction of major public buildings

Nearly all the major public buildings and institutions in Hyderabad city, such as the Hyderabad High Court, Jubilee Hall, Nizamia Observatory, Moazzam Jahi Market, Kachiguda Railway Station, Asafiya Library (State Central Library, Hyderabad), the Town Hall now known as the Assembly Hall, Hyderabad Museum now known as the State Museum; hospitals like Osmania General Hospital, Nizamia Hospital and many other buildings were constructed under his reign. He also built the Hyderabad House in Delhi, now used for diplomatic meetings by the Government of India.

Establishment of Hyderabad State Bank

In 1941, he started his own bank, the Hyderabad State Bank. It was later renamed State Bank of Hyderabad and merged with the State Bank of India as the state's central bank in 2017. It was established on 8 August 1941 under the Hyderabad State Bank Act. The bank managed the Osmania Sikka (Hyderabadi rupee), the currency of the state of Hyderabad. It was the only state in India which had its own currency, and the only state in British India where the ruler was allowed to issue currency. In 1953, the bank absorbed, by merger, the Mercantile Bank of Hyderabad, which Raja Pannalal Pitti had founded in 1935.

In 1956, the Reserve Bank of India took over the bank as its first subsidiary and renamed it State Bank of Hyderabad (SBH). The Subsidiary Banks Act was passed in 1959. On 1 October 1959, SBH and the other banks of the princely states became subsidiaries of SBI. It merged with SBI on 31 March 2017.

Flood prevention

After the Great Musi Flood of 1908, which killed an estimated 50,000 people, the Nizam constructed two lakes to prevent flooding—the Osman Sagar and Himayat Sagar named after himself, and his son Azam Jah respectively.

Agricultural reforms

The Nizam founded agricultural research in the Marathwada region of Hyderabad State with the establishment of the Main Experimental Farm in 1918 in Parbhani. During his rule, agricultural education was available only at Hyderabad; crop research centres for sorghum, cotton, and fruits existed in Parbhani. After independence, the Indian government developed this facility further and renamed Marathwada Agriculture University on 18 May 1972.

Contribution to Indian aviation
India's first airport—the Begumpet Airport—was established in the 1930s with the formation of the Hyderabad Aero Club by the Nizam.
Initially, it was used as a domestic and international airport by Deccan Airways Limited, the first airline in British India. The airport terminal was constructed in 1937.
Contribution to Indian National defence

Philanthropy

Donations towards Hindu temples

The Nizam donated Rs. 82,825 to the Yadagirigutta temple at Bhongir, Rs. 29,999 to the Sita Ramachandraswamy temple, Bhadrachalam and Rs. 8,000 to the Tirupati Balaji Temple.

He also donated Rs. 50,000 towards the re-construction of Sitarambagh temple located in the old city of Hyderabad, and bestowed a grant of 100,000 Hyderabadi rupees towards the reconstruction of Thousand Pillar Temple.

After hearing about the Golden Temple of Amritsar through Maharaja Ranjit Singh, Mir Osman Ali Khan started providing it with yearly grants.

Donation towards the compilation of the Holy Mahabharata
In 1932, there was a need for money for the publication of the Holy Mahabharata by the Bhandarkar Oriental Research Institute located in Pune. A formal request was made to Mir Osman Ali Khan who granted Rs. 1000 per year for a period of 11 years.

He also gave Rs 50,000 for the construction of the institute's guest house which stands today as the Nizam Guest House.

Donation in Gold to the National Defence Fund

In October 1965, during the Sino-Indian War, the PM Lal Bahadur Shastri visited Hyderabad and requested the Nizam to contribute generously to the National Defence Fund, set up in the wake of the Indo-Chinese skirmish. In response, the Nizam announced that he would contribute five tonnes (5,000kg) of gold to augment the war fund. In terms of today’s gold price in the international market, this donation translates to a whopping Rs 1,500 crore.

Donations to educational institutions

The Nizam donated Rs 1 million for the Banaras Hindu University, Rs. 500,000 for the Aligarh Muslim University, and 300,000 for the Indian Institute of Science.

He also made large donations to many institutions in India and abroad with special emphasis given to educational institutions such as the Jamia Nizamia and the Darul Uloom Deoband.

Restoration of Ajanta Ellora caves
During the  early 1920s, the Ajanta site was in the territory of the princely state of the Hyderabad and Osman Ali Khan (the Nizam of Hyderabad) appointed experts to restore the artwork, converted the site into a museum and built a road to enable tourists come to the site.

The Nizam's Director of Archaeology obtained the services of two experts from Italy, Professor Lorenzo Cecconi, assisted by Count Orsini, to restore the paintings in the caves. The Director of Archaeology for the last Nizam of Hyderabad said of the work of Cecconi and Orsini:

Operation Polo and abdication

After Indian independence in 1947, the country was partitioned into India and Pakistan. The princely states were left free to make whatever arrangement they wished with either India or Pakistan. But unlike the other princely states, Nizam refused to sign the instrument of accession. Instead he opted to sign a 1-year standstill agreement agreed upon by the British, and signed by then viceroy Lord Mountbatten. The Nizam refused to join either India or Pakistan, preferring to form a separate independent kingdom within the British Commonwealth of Nations.

This proposal for independence was rejected by the British government, but the Nizam continued to explore it. Towards this end, he kept up open negotiations with the Government of India regarding the modalities of a future relationship while opening covert negotiations with Pakistan in a similar vein. The Nizam cited the Razakars as evidence that the people of the state were opposed to any agreement with India.

The one year standstill agreement turned out to be a severe blow to the Nizam as it gave all foreign affairs, communication and defense power to the Indian government. The new Indian government wasn't happy that a sovereign state would exist right at the center of India. In accordance to this, they ultimately decided to invade Hyderabad in 1948, in an operation code-named Operation Polo. Under the supervision of Major General Jayanto Nath Chaudhuri, one division of the Indian Army and a tank brigade invaded and captured Hyderabad. The annexation was over in just 109 hours or roughly 4 days. Due to no foreign connections and no real defense the war was a losing cause for Hyderabad from the start. After the annexation the territory came under Indian rule and Nizam was removed from his position but allowed to keep all personal wealth and title.

Wealth

The Nizam was so wealthy that he was portrayed on the cover of Time magazine on 22 February 1937, being described as the world's richest man. At its peak, the wealth of Osman Ali Khan, Asaf Jah VII was worth  (all his conceivable assets combined) in the early 1940s, while his entire treasure of jewels, would be worth between US$150 million and US$500 million variously in today's terms. He used the Jacob Diamond, a 185-carat diamond that is part of the Nizam's jewellery, as a paperweight. During his days as Nizam, he was reputed to be the richest man in the world, having a fortune estimated at US$2 billion in the early 1940s ( US$ in  dollars) or two per cent of the US economy then.

The Nizam's personal fortune was estimated to be roughly £110 million, including £40 million in gold and jewels (equivalent to £ in ).

The Indian government still exhibits the jewellery as the Jewels of the Nizams of Hyderabad (now in Delhi). The collection includes gemstones, turban ornaments, necklaces and pendants, belts and buckles, earrings, armbands, bangles and bracelets, anklets, cufflinks and buttons, watch chains, and rings, toe rings, and nose rings.

Along with the Nizam’s jewels, two Bari gold coins worth hundreds of crores, were considered the rarest in the world. Himayat Ali Mirza has requested the central government to bring these coins, which were made in the Arabic script should be brought back to Hyderabad.

Gift to Queen Elizabeth II
In 1947, the Nizam made a gift of diamond jewels, including a tiara and necklace, to the future Queen Elizabeth II on the occasion of her marriage. The brooches and necklace were still worn by the Queen until her death and the necklace is known as the Nizam of Hyderabad necklace.

Personal life

The Nizam lived at King Kothi Palace—bought from a nobleman(Kamal Khan an architect of those times)—from age 13 until his death. He never moved to Chowmahalla Palace, even after his accession to the throne.

Unlike his father, he was not interested in fine clothing or hunting. His hobbies rather included poetry and writing ghazals in Urdu.

He revered his mother and visited her every day she was alive; he used to visit her grave almost every day after she died.

Family
On 14 April 1906, at the age of 21, he first married Azam Unnisa Begum (Dulhan Pasha Begum), a daughter of the noble Nawab Jahangir Jung. His first son Azam Jah married Durru Shehvar, (daughter of the Ottoman caliph Abdul Mejid II), while his second son Moazzam Jah married Niloufer, (a niece of the Ottoman sultan). 

Azam Jah and Durru Shehvar had two sons, Mukarram Jah and Muffakham Jah, with the former succeeding his grandfather as the de jure Nizam. 

The 7th Nizam in total, had 34 children: 18 sons and 16 daughters.from his 8 wives

His second son HH Moazzam Jah had three wives  first being princess Nilofer. Since princess Niloufer couldn't bear a child, Moazzam Jah married Razia Begum and had three daughters - princess Fatima Fouzia, princess Amina Merzia and princess Oolia Kulsum. Prince Moazzam Jah also married Anwari Begum and had a son prince Shahmat Jah.

Another socially prominent grandson is Mir Najaf Ali Khan,
 who represents several trusts of the last Nizam, including the H.E.H. the Nizam's Charitable Trust and the Nizam Family Welfare Association. 

Lately, Nizam's name was being used by various parties for political gains. Another great grandson, Himayat Ali Mirza wrote to prime minister in this regard along with Election Commission of India, requesting political parties not to use Nizam's name in today's politics as it is both disrespectful to such a great personality.

The Nizams' daughters had been married traditionally to young men of the House of Paigah. This family belonged to the Sunni sect.

Final years and death

The Nizam continued to stay at the King Kothi Palace until his death. He used to issue firmans on inconsequential matters in his newspaper, the Nizam Gazette.

He died on Friday, 24 February 1967. In his will, he asked to buried in Masjid-e Judi, a mosque where his mother was buried, that faced King Kothi Palace. The government declared state mourning on 25 February 1967, the day when he was buried. State government offices remained closed as a mark of respect while the National Flag of India was flown at half-mast on all the government buildings throughout the state. The Nizam Museum documents state : "The streets and pavements of the city were littered with the pieces of broken glass bangles as an incalculable number of women broke their bangles in mourning, which Telangana women usually do as per Indian customs on the death of a close relative."
"The Nizam's funeral procession was the biggest non-religious, non-political meeting of people in the history of India till that date."
Millions of people of all religions from different parts of the state entered Hyderabad in trains, buses and bullocks for a last glimpse of their king in a coffin in the King Kothi Palace Camp in Hyderabad. The crowd was so uncontrollable that barricades were installed alongside the road to enable people to move in a queue. D. Bhaskara Rao, chief curator, of the Nizam's Museum stated that an estimated one million (1 million) people were part of the procession.

Title and salutation

Salutation style
The Nizam was the honorary Colonel of the 20 Deccan Horse. In 1918, King George V elevated Nawab Mir Osman Ali Khan Siddiqi Bahadur from "His Highness" to "His Exalted Highness". In a letter dated 24 January 1918, the title "Faithful Ally of the British Government' was conferred on him.

Full Titular Name
The titles during his life were:

1886–1911: Nawab Bahadur Mir Osman Ali Khan Siddqi.
1911–1912: His Highness Rustam-i-Dauran, Arustu-i-Zaman, Wal Mamaluk, Asaf Jah VII, Muzaffar ul-Mamaluk, Nizam ul-Mulk, Nizam ud-Daula, Nawab Mir Sir Osman ‘Ali Khan Siddqi Bahadur, Sipah Salar, Fath Jang, Nizam of Hyderabad, GCSI
1912–1917: Colonel His Highness Rustam-i-Dauran, Arustu-i-Zaman, Wal Mamaluk, Asaf Jah VII, Muzaffar ul-Mamaluk, Nizam ul-Mulk, Nizam ud-Daula, Nawab Mir Sir Osman ‘Ali Khan Siddqi Bahadur, Sipah Salar, Fath Jang, Nizam of Hyderabad, GCSI
1917–1918: Colonel His Highness Rustam-i-Dauran, Arustu-i-Zaman, Wal Mamaluk, Asaf Jah VII, Muzaffar ul-Mamaluk, Nizam ul-Mulk, Nizam ud-Daula, Nawab Mir Sir Osman ‘Ali Khan Siddqi Bahadur, Sipah Salar, Fath Jang, Nizam of Hyderabad, GCSI, GBE
1918–1936: Lieutenant-General His Exalted Highness Rustam-i-Dauran, Arustu-i-Zaman, Wal Mamaluk, Asaf Jah VII, Muzaffar ul-Mamaluk, Nizam ul-Mulk, Nizam ud-Daula, Nawab Mir Sir Osman ‘Ali Khan Siddqi Bahadur, Sipah Salar, Fath Jang, Faithful Ally of the British Government, Nizam of Hyderabad, GCSI, GBE
1936–1941: Lieutenant-General His Exalted Highness Rustam-i-Dauran, Arustu-i-Zaman, Wal Mamaluk, Asaf Jah VII, Muzaffar ul-Mamaluk, Nizam ul-Mulk, Nizam ud-Daula, Nawab Mir Sir Osman ‘Ali Khan Siddqi Bahadur, Sipah Salar, Fath Jang, Faithful Ally of the British Government, Nizam of Hyderabad and Berar, GCSI, GBE
1941–1967: General His Exalted Highness Rustam-i-Dauran, Arustu-i-Zaman, Wal Mamaluk, Asaf Jah VII, Muzaffar ul-Mamaluk, Nizam ul-Mulk, Nizam ud-Daula, Nawab Mir Sir Osman ‘Ali Khan Siddqi Bahadur, Sipah Salar, Fath Jang, Faithful Ally of the British Government, Nizam of Hyderabad and Berar, GCSI, GBE.

Honours and Eponyms
 Delhi Durbar Gold Medal, 1911 as part of the 1911 Delhi Durbar Honours,
 GCSI: Knight Grand Commander of the Order of the Star of India, 1911
 GCStJ: Bailiff Grand Cross of the Order of St John, 1911
 GBE: Knight Grand Cross of the Order of the British Empire, 1917
 King George V Silver Jubilee Medal, 1935
 King George VI Coronation Medal, 1937
 Royal Victorian Chain, 1946

List of Eponyms
 Osmania General Hospital
 Osmania Biscuit
 Osman Sagar, a reservoir in Hyderabad
 Osmanabad
 The Nizam of Hyderabad necklace
 The Nizam Gate of Ajmer Sharif Dargah

See also
Establishments of the Nizams
Hospitals established by the Nizams
Nizam's Guaranteed State Railway
Nizams of Hyderabad
Asaf Jahi dynasty
Hyderabad State

References

Further reading
 
 The Splendour of Hyderabad: The Last Phase of an Oriental Culture (1591–1948 A.D.) By M.A. Nayeem 
 The Nocturnal Court: The Life of a Prince of Hyderabad  By Sidq Jaisi
Developments in Administration Under H.E.H. the Nizam VII By Shamim Aleem, M. A. Aleem Developments in Administration Under H.E.H. the Nizam VII
 Jewels of the Nizams (Hardcover) by Usha R. Krishnan (Author) 
 Fabulous Mogul: Nizam VII of Hyderabad By Dosoo Framjee Karaka Published 1955 D. Verschoyle, Original from the University of Michigan Fabulous Mogul: Nizam VII of Hyderabad
 The Seventh Nizam: The Fallen Empire By Zubaida Yazdani, Mary Chrystal 
 The Last Nizam: The Life and Times of Mir Osman Ali Khan By V.K. Bawa, Basant K. Bawa 
 The Seventh Nizam of Hyderabad: An Archival Appraisal By Sayyid Dā'ūd Ashraf The Seventh Nizam of Hyderabad: An Archival Appraisal

External links

"The Nizam often used to call Muslims and the Hindus as his two eyes" in Siasat
The Nizam of Hyderabad on the cover of Time

1886 births
1967 deaths
Rajpramukhs
Hyderabadi Muslims
20th-century Indian philanthropists
India MPs 1957–1962
India MPs 1962–1967
Lok Sabha members from Andhra Pradesh
20th-century Indian educational theorists
Monarchs who abdicated
People from Marathwada
20th-century Indian royalty
Madhya Bharat politicians
Founders of Indian schools and colleges
Knights Grand Commander of the Order of the Star of India
Indian Knights Grand Cross of the Order of the British Empire
Bailiffs Grand Cross of the Order of St John
Asaf Jahi dynasty
Nizams of Hyderabad
Indian philanthropists